In mathematics, the conformal dimension of a metric space X is the infimum of the Hausdorff dimension over the conformal gauge of X, that is, the class of all metric spaces quasisymmetric to X.

Formal definition

Let X be a metric space and  be the collection of all metric spaces that are quasisymmetric to X. The conformal dimension of X is defined as such

Properties

We have the following inequalities, for a metric space X:

 

The second inequality is true by definition.  The first one is deduced from the fact that the topological dimension T is invariant by homeomorphism, and thus can be defined as the infimum of the Hausdorff dimension over all spaces homeomorphic to X.

Examples

 The Cantor set K is of null conformal dimension.  However, there is no metric space quasisymmetric to K with a 0 Hausdorff dimension.

See also
Anomalous scaling dimension

References

Fractals
Metric geometry
Dimension theory